María Dolores Gorostiaga Saiz (born 24 February 1957) is a Spanish politician from the Spanish Socialist Workers' Party who served as Vice President of Cantabria from 2003 and 2011, Regional Minister of Institutional Relations and European Affairs from 2003 to 2007 and Regional Minister of Employment and Social Welfare from 2007 to 2011, as well as President of the Parliament of Cantabria from 2015 to 2019.

References

1957 births
Politicians from Cantabria
Spanish Socialist Workers' Party politicians
Living people